Anneliese Kitzmüller (born 3 July 1959) is an Austrian politician who has been a Member of the National Council for the Freedom Party of Austria (FPÖ) since 2008. From December 2017 to October 2019, she was the Third President of the Austrian National Council.

References

1959 births
Living people
Members of the National Council (Austria)
Freedom Party of Austria politicians
Austrian women in politics